This is a list of electoral results for the electoral district of Townsville North in Queensland state elections.

Members for Townsville North

Election results

Elections in the 1960s

References

Queensland state electoral results by district